The 12703 / 12704 Falaknuma Express is a Superfast Express train belonging to South Central Railway zone that runs between Secunderabad and Howrah, (Kolkata) in India. It is currently being operated with 12703/12704 train numbers on daily basis.

Overview

The train is named after the world-famous Falaknuma Palace in Hyderabad. "Falaknuma" is a Persian word (Persian—فلک ا نمایش), which means "Reflections of Sky/Heaven".

It is a fast alternative to other trains such as East Coast Express, Guwahati–Secunderabad Express, Shalimar–Secunderabad AC Superfast Express and Shalimar–Secunderabad Superfast Express. Compared to the other trains from Secunderabad to Kolkata, it covers lesser distance as it runs via the Nalgonda, Guntur Junction route. It is the fastest Superfast Express between Secunderabad and Visakhapatnam other than Visakhapatnam–Secunderabad Duronto Express & Visakhapatnam–Secunderabad Garib Rath Express. The train runs jampacked throughout the year because people prefer this train as it has lesser halts than other trains on this route. Besides being Superfast, the train is most neat and clean after trains like Shatabdi Express, Rajdhani Express and Duronto Express and other Superfast trains in India.

The 12703/Howrah–Secunderabad Falaknuma Express has an average speed of 60 km/h and covers 1544 km in 25h 40m. The 12704/Secunderabad–Howrah Falaknuma Express, with the same average speed, covers the same distance in 25h 50m.

Timings

The train departs from Platform #21 of Howrah Junction at 08:35 IST and arrives in Platform #9 of Secunderabad Junction at 10:10 IST, the next day. From Platform #2 of Secunderabad, the train departs at 15:55 IST and arrives in Platform #20 of Howrah at 17:45 IST, the next day.

Route & Halts

Classes

The train usually consists of a massive load of 24 standard ICF coach:

 1 AC First Cum Two Tier
 1 AC Two Tier
 3 AC Three Tiers
 13 Sleeper classes
 1 Pantry car
 3 General (unreserved)
 2 Seating (Disabled/Ladies) cum Luggage Rakes

As is customary with most other train services in India, coach composition may be amended at the discretion of Indian Railways, depending on demand.

Coach composition

Gallery

Loco link

 A Lallaguda-based WAP-7 electric locomotive pulls it from Secunderabad to Visakhapatnam.

Rake sharing

The 12703/12704 Falaknuma Express previously used to share its rakes with 12733/12734 Narayanadri Express (Secunderabad–Tirupati), but now, it shares its rakes 17063/17064 Ajanta Express (Secunderabad–Manmad).

References

External links
 Falaknuma train status

Rail transport in Howrah
Named passenger trains of India
Transport in Secunderabad
Express trains in India
Rail transport in Telangana
Rail transport in Andhra Pradesh
Rail transport in West Bengal
Rail transport in Odisha